The 6th Scottish Parliament was elected at the 2021 Scottish Parliament election. It was opened with the Escort to the Crown of Scotland Parade and Speech from the Throne on 2 October 2021.

Composition 
Government parties denoted with bullets (•)

Leadership 

 Presiding Officer: Alison Johnstone (Independent)
 Deputy Presiding Officers: Annabelle Ewing (SNP), Liam McArthur (Lib Dems)

Government 

 First Minister: Nicola Sturgeon (SNP)
 Deputy First Minister: John Swinney (SNP)
 Minister for Parliamentary Business: George Adam (SNP)

Opposition 

 Leader of the Opposition: Douglas Ross (Conservatives)
 Secondary Opposition Leader: Anas Sarwar (Labour)
 Tertiary Opposition Co-Leaders: Patrick Harvie & Lorna Slater (Greens)
 Leader of the Liberal Democrats: Alex Cole-Hamilton (Liberal Democrats)

List of MSPs
This is a list of MSPs so far elected. The changes table below records all changes in party affiliation during the session, since the May 2021 election.

There are eight MSPs who have been constant members since the inauguration of the Parliament in 1999 (ten other founding members retired prior to the 2021 election): Jackie Baillie, Fergus Ewing and John Swinney have been elected six times under the same constituency (Swinney's was renamed with different boundaries in 2011); Christine Grahame, Fiona Hyslop, Michael Matheson, Shona Robison and Nicola Sturgeon were returned as a list member then a constituency member. A ninth MSP Richard Lochhead has served almost the same term, resigning his list seat in 2006 to successfully contest a by-election a few weeks later for a constituency seat, which he has defended since then.

Former MSPs

Changes

References

External links
 Scottish Parliament website
 Current and previous Members of the Scottish Parliament (MSPs), on the Scottish Parliament website

Lists of Members of the Scottish Parliament by term